Jurgita Mačikunytė (born 12 January 1984) is a Lithuanian football referee and a former player who played as a goalkeeper. She has been a member of the Lithuania women's national team.

International career
Mačikunytė capped for Lithuania at senior level during the UEFA Women's Euro 2009 qualifying (preliminary round).

References

1984 births
Living people
Women's association football goalkeepers
Women association football referees
Women's association football referees
Lithuanian women's footballers
Lithuania women's international footballers
Gintra Universitetas players
Lithuanian football referees